Maranalloor  is a village in Thiruvananthapuram district in the state of Kerala, India.

Location

It is 18 km from Kerala State Road Transport Corporation's Central Bus Depot, Thampanoor. There are regular bus services to other parts of city also.[2] It is only 6 kilometres from National Highway 47(Trivandrum-nagercoil). Nearest towns are Balaramapuram, Kattakkada and Neyyattinkara.

Railway station is 3 km away. The railway line connects Kanyakumari and Thiruvananthapuram Central.

Demographics
 India census, Maranalloor had a population of 35610 with 17507 males and 18103 females.

References

Villages in Thiruvananthapuram district